The First Methodist Church is a historic building in Moscow, Idaho. It was built in 1904. The first minister was Reverend William Tell Euster, who authored The Philosophy of Church Building.

The building was designed by architect H. N. Black in the Gothic Revival and Romanesque Revival styles. It has been listed on the National Register of Historic Places since October 5, 1978.

References

Churches on the National Register of Historic Places in Idaho
National Register of Historic Places in Latah County, Idaho
Gothic Revival church buildings in Idaho
Romanesque Revival church buildings in Idaho
Churches completed in 1904